Jozef Oostfries (1628–1661) was a Dutch Golden Age glass painter.

Biography
Oostfries was born in Hoorn.  According to Houbraken he was a pupil of the glasspainter Jan Maartz Engelsman and the older brother and teacher of Catharina Oostfries, who kept up her drawing and glass painting into her seventies.
His pupil was Jan Slob.

References

Jozef Oostfries in Catharina Oostfries biography on inghist
stained glass window in church of De Rijp

1628 births
1661 deaths
Dutch Golden Age painters
Dutch male painters
People from Hoorn